Central Pacific may refer to:
 Central Pacific Railroad, the western part of the Transcontinental Railroad in the United States
 Central Pacific Area, a subdivision of the Pacific Ocean Areas, an Allied military command in World War II
 Central Pacific languages, a branch of the Oceanic languages